The Post Punk Kitchen is a vegan cooking show that aired on Brooklyn and Manhattan public-access television cable TV from 2003 to 2005. The shows were available on DVD as well.

The show was created by Isa Chandra Moskowitz, the author of the cookbooks Vegan With A Vengeance, Vegan Cupcakes Take Over The World, and Veganomicon. Terry Hope Romero co-hosted.

The show was filmed in Moskowitz's small kitchen in the Prospect Heights section of Brooklyn. The hosts cooked vegan food to a back drop of punk rock music and featured local bands such as Made Out of Babies and The Cuban Cowboys "prepping" while singing one of their songs.

Episodes one to four are available to view online on YouTube.

References

External links
 The Post Punk Kitchen website
 Gothamist interview with Isa Chandra Moskowitz
 
 
 
 

2000s American cooking television series
Veganism